) was the official hymn of the Italian National Fascist Party, regime, and army, and was an unofficial national anthem of the Kingdom of Italy between 1924 and 1943. Although often sung with the official national anthem Marcia Reale, some sources consider Giovinezza to have supplanted the Royal March as the de facto national anthem of Italy, to the dismay of Victor Emmanuel III of Italy—a powerful symbol of the diarchy between the King and Mussolini. It was subsequently the official anthem of the Italian Social Republic.

Ubiquitous in mid-twentieth century Italy, the hymn emphasized youth as a theme of the fascist movement and was one example of the centrality of the Arditi to the fascist narrative.

History
"Giovinezza" was composed by lawyer and composer Giuseppe Blanc in 1909 as "Il Commiato" (Italian for "farewell"). Blanc later also wrote other fascist songs, including The Eagles of Rome, an Ode to the Italian Empire. Previously a Turin university graduation song, and popular among Italian soldiers during World War I, the song was called "Inno degli Arditi" (Hymn of the Arditi, a corps of the Italian Royal Army during World War I, whose members joined the fascist movement in large numbers). The hymn was further popularized by the mass rallies of Gabriele d'Annunzio in Fiume.

The version sung during the March on Rome was composed by G. Castaldo in 1921, using the original score by Giuseppe Blanc and words by Marcello Manni (beginning "Su compagni in forte schiere"). After the March on Rome, where it was sung, Mussolini commissioned Salvator Gotta to write the new lyrics, which were completed in 1924.

Gotta's version plays on fascist themes like youth and nationalism. Its reference to "Alighieri's vision" is an allusion to Dante Alighieri marking Italy's borders on the Quarnaro (Kvarner) Gulf, thus including the province of Istria, a territory granted to Italy after World War I.

After the capitulation of Italy in 1944, the Allies suppressed the hymn in Italy. At the time, Italy had no national anthem, until Il Canto degli Italiani was provisionally chosen when Italy became a Republic on 12 October 1946, only to be officially legislated on 4 December 2017.

Lyrics

1922 Lyrics

1924 Lyrics

The lines "E per Benito Mussolini / Eja eja alalà / E per la nostra Patria bella / Eja eja alalà" do not appear in some recorded and published versions of the song.

Performances
"Giovinezza" was played "with the slightest pretext" at sporting events, films, and other public gatherings, and often carried adverse (even violent) consequences for those who did not join in. Even foreigners were roughed up by blackshirts if they failed to remove their hats and show respect when "Giovinezza" was played.

In the 1930s, "Giovinezza" was made the official anthem of the Italian army. The school day was required to be opened either with "Giovinezza" or "Balilla", the song of the Opera Nazionale Balilla. A faint, recorded version of the hymn played in the background of the Chapel of the Fascist Martyrs in the Exhibition of the Fascist Revolution.

There was a German song with German lyrics, set to the same tune as Giovinezza; "Hitlerleute" (Hitler's people) replacing "Giovinezza".  A Japanese translation of Giovinezza, "黒シャツ党の歌" (lit. The song of blackshirts party) and "ファシストの歌" (lit. Fascist Song), was created in commemoration of the Tripartite Pact and used in Japanese overseas broadcasting.

Italian tenor Beniamino Gigli recorded "Giovinezza" in 1937, although the anthem is noticeably excluded from his "Edizione Integrale", released by EMI. "Giovinezza" followed the inauguration of the Fascist parliament in 1924 (following the Acerbo law) and preceded the Nazi radio broadcast announcing the creation of the Italian Social Republic.  

"Giovinezza" was sung on 12 March 1939, the day of Pope Pius XII's coronation, by the Pope's Palatine Guard.  After the last ceremony of his papal coronation was over Pius XII went to rest in the Lateran Palace.  The singing occurred during a moment of public bonhomie between the Palatine Guards and the Italian Guards, "Palatine and Italian Guards exchanged courtesies, the former playing the fascist anthem, "Giovinezza" and the latter the papal hymn." This incident, which was not part of the coronation ceremony and took place without the knowledge or approval of Pope Pius XII is sometimes used to portray Pius XII as a crypto-fascist.

Toscanini
Arturo Toscanini (who had previously run as a Fascist parliamentary candidate in 1919 and whom Mussolini had called "the greatest conductor in the world") notably refused to conduct "Giovinezza" on multiple occasions. Toscanini had refused to play "Giovinezza" in Milan in 1922 and later in Bayreuth, which earned him accolades from anti-fascists throughout Europe. Mussolini did not attend the premier of Puccini's Turandot on 15 April 1926having been invited by the management of La Scalabecause Toscanini would not play Giovinezza before the performance. Finally, Toscanini refused to conduct "Giovinezza" at a May 1931 concert in Bologna, was subsequently roughed up by a group of blackshirts, and thereafter left Italy until after World War II.

Relationship to Marcia Reale
The Royal March had often preceded "Giovinezza" on official occasions, as required by official regulations following an abortive attempt to conflate the two songs. Many considered the Royal March "long winded and gaudy", and these faults were thrown into sharp relief by back-to-back ceremonial presentations. "Giovinezza" was used as a sign-off by Italian radio under Mussolini; after the ousting of Mussolini in 1943, the Italian radio signed off for the first time in 21 years playing only the Royal March, "Marcia Reale".

See also
 Il Canto degli Italiani - the current Italian national anthem
 Faccetta Nera
 Horst-Wessel-Lied
 Cara al Sol

References

External links
 Giovinezza 78rpm record on the Internet Archive
Lyrics
 Giovinezza in Italian and English
 Giovinezza in Italian and German
 Giovinezza in Italian and Spanish

Political party songs
Italian anthems
1909 songs
Historical national anthems
Italian fascist songs
Fascist symbols